Albrecht Schmidt is the name of:

 Albrecht Schmidt (computer scientist) (born 1970), computer scientist
 Albrecht Schmidt (actor) (born 1870), Danish actor